Vía Blanca is a highway in northern Cuba, connecting the capital city of Havana and the city of Matanzas. A second section extends eastwards from Matanzas to the tourist town of Varadero and to Cárdenas. Even if it is a motorway (autopista), it is part of the national highway named "Circuito Norte" (CN).

History
The motorway, connected to the A2 (Havana Ring Road), was opened in 1960. Its construction begun in 1945 with the bridge of Bacunayagua, on the Mayabeque/Matanzas province border. This is the highest Cuban bridge and was completed in 1960.

Route

Overview
It is mostly a four lane highway, with some divided sections. It runs east-west for 85 km between Havana and Matanzas, crossing the town of Santa Cruz del Norte, and an additional 53 km east to Varadero, at the northern tip of Peninsula de Hicacos (the section between Matanzas and Varadero is a toll road). Most of the highway runs along the Straits of Florida shoreline. This is one of the busiest highways in Cuba, as it joins the two tourist destinations of Havana and Varadero.

Description
Vía Blanca starts at the Ciudad Deportiva, on the south-western side of Havana, between Cerro and Diez de Octubre. It runs for 12 km through Luyanó and Old Havana border, the harbour area, Regla and Guanabacoa, before crossing the Vía Monumental in Habana del Este. A brief section in Luyanó includes the route of the Carretera Central highway.

The motorway-type section starts in Havana, on a roundabout (Rotonda de Cojímar) before the Monumental, and ends north of Cárdenas. In Matanzas city center it crosses the seafront. It is a dual carriageway road, with four lanes for almost the entire route, but there are six lanes for a short section in east Havana. It has some at-grade intersections with rural roads. The exit at Varadero is the starting point of an 18-km long beltway, named Autopista Sur ("South Motorway"), that runs through the town.

The table below shows the exits of the motorway-type section of the Vía Blanca:

See also

Roads in Cuba
Carretera Central
Transport in Cuba
Infrastructure of Cuba

References

External links

Guije.com: Vía Blanca on guije.com — (with photos)

Autopista Via Blanca
Transport in Havana
Matanzas Province
Mayabeque Province